Stefanie is the seventh studio album by Singaporean singer Stefanie Sun, released on 29 October 2004 by Warner Music Taiwan. The song, "I Miss Him Too", is the Taiwan's promotional song of 2004 Japanese live-action film, Socrates in Love. The album earned an IFPI Hong Kong Top Sales Music Award for Top 10 Best Selling Mandarin Albums of the Year in 2004. The album also earned two Golden Melody Award nominations for Best Mandarin Album and Best Mandarin Female Singer in 2005, and she finally won Best Mandarin Female Singer.

Track listing
 "奔" (Running)
 "我的愛" (My Love)
 "祝你開心" (Wish You Happiness)
 "我也很想他" (I Miss Him Too)
 "聽見" (Heard)
 "慢慢來" (Take It Slow)
 "同類" (Someone Like Me)
 "種" (Nurture Your Dreams)
 "反過來走走" (Turn Around)
 "Stefanie"
 "Let's Vino"
 "未知的精彩" (The Brilliant Unknown Future)

References

2004 albums
Stefanie Sun albums
Warner Music Taiwan albums